Seetharampuram is a small village in Aswapuram Mandal, Khammam District, Telangana, India.

References

Villages in Khammam district